Beaser School is a former school in Ashland, Wisconsin, United States. Built in 1895, it is a brick and brownstone building designed by architect Henry Wildhagen. It has a brownstone arch over a recessed entryway. It was expanded in 1955.  

The building was added to the National Register of Historic Places in 1980, along with three other schools in Ashland also designed by Wildhagen: Ashland Middle School (1904), Ellis School (1900), and Wilmarth School (1895).

In 1991, Beaser School became the headquarters of Cooperative Educational Service Agency #12.

Notes

References 

Buildings and structures in Ashland County, Wisconsin
Defunct schools in Wisconsin
School buildings on the National Register of Historic Places in Wisconsin
1899 establishments in Wisconsin
National Register of Historic Places in Ashland County, Wisconsin
Ashland, Wisconsin
School buildings completed in 1899